There is a strong scientific consensus that the Earth is warming and that this warming is mainly caused by human activities. This consensus is supported by various studies of scientists' opinions and by position statements of scientific organizations, many of which explicitly agree with the Intergovernmental Panel on Climate Change (IPCC) synthesis reports.

Nearly all actively publishing climate scientists say humans are causing climate change. Surveys of the scientific literature are another way to measure scientific consensus. A 2019 review of scientific papers found the consensus on the cause of climate change to be at 100%, and a 2021 study concluded that over 99% of scientific papers agree on the human cause of climate change. The small percentage of papers that disagreed with the consensus either cannot be replicated or contain errors.

Consensus points
The current scientific consensus is that:
 Earth's climate has warmed significantly since the late 1800s.
 Human activities (primarily greenhouse gas emissions) are the primary cause.
 Continuing emissions will increase the likelihood and severity of global effects.
 People and nations can act individually and collectively to  slow the pace of global warming, while also preparing for unavoidable climate change and its consequences.

Several studies of the consensus have been undertaken. Among the most cited is a 2013 study of nearly 12,000 abstracts of peer-reviewed papers on climate science published since 1990, of which just over 4,000 papers expressed an opinion on the cause of recent global warming. Of these, 97% agree, explicitly or implicitly, that global warming is happening and is human-caused. It is "extremely likely" that this warming arises from "human activities, especially emissions of greenhouse gases" in the atmosphere. Natural change alone would have had a slight cooling effect rather than a warming effect.

This scientific opinion is expressed in synthesis reports, by scientific bodies of national or international standing, and by surveys of opinion among climate scientists. Individual scientists, universities, and laboratories contribute to the overall scientific opinion via their peer-reviewed publications, and the areas of collective agreement and relative certainty are summarised in these respected reports and surveys.
The IPCC's Fifth Assessment Report (AR5) was completed in 2014. Its conclusions are summarized below:
 "Warming of the climate system is unequivocal, and since the 1950s, many of the observed changes are unprecedented over decades to millennia."
 "Atmospheric concentrations of carbon dioxide, methane, and nitrous oxide have increased to levels unprecedented in at least the last 800,000 years."
 Human influence on the climate system is clear. It is extremely likely (95–100% probability) that human influence was the dominant cause of global warming between 1951 and 2010.
 "Increasing magnitudes of [global] warming increase the likelihood of severe, pervasive, and irreversible impacts."
 "A first step towards adaptation to future climate change is reducing vulnerability and exposure to present climate variability."
 "The overall risks of climate change impacts can be reduced by limiting the rate and magnitude of climate change"
 Without new policies to mitigate climate change, projections suggest an increase in global mean temperature in 2100 of 3.7 to 4.8 °C, relative to pre-industrial levels (median values; the range is 2.5 to 7.8 °C including climate uncertainty).
 The current trajectory of global greenhouse gas emissions is not consistent with limiting global warming to below 1.5 or 2 °C, relative to pre-industrial levels. Pledges made as part of the Cancún Agreements are broadly consistent with cost-effective scenarios that give a "likely" chance (66–100% probability) of limiting global warming (in 2100) to below 3 °C, relative to pre-industrial levels.

National and international science academies and scientific societies have assessed current scientific opinion on global warming. These assessments are generally consistent with the conclusions of the Intergovernmental Panel on Climate Change.

Some scientific bodies have recommended specific policies to governments, and science can play a role in informing an effective response to climate change. Policy decisions, however, may require value judgements and so are not included in the scientific opinion.

No scientific body of national or international standing maintains a formal opinion dissenting from any of these main points. The last national or international scientific body to drop dissent was the American Association of Petroleum Geologists, which in 2007 updated its statement to its current non-committal position. Some other organizations, primarily those focusing on geology, also hold non-committal positions.

Synthesis reports 
Synthesis reports are assessments of scientific literature that compile the results of a range of stand-alone studies in order to achieve a broad level of understanding, or to describe the state of knowledge of a given subject.

Intergovernmental Panel on Climate Change (IPCC) 2014 

The IPCC Fifth Assessment Report followed the same general format as the Fourth Assessment Report, with three Working Group reports and a Synthesis report. The Working Group I report (WG1) was published in September 2013. The report's Summary for Policymakers stated that warming of the climate system is 'unequivocal' with changes unprecedented over decades to millennia, including warming of the atmosphere and oceans, loss of snow and ice, and sea level rise. Greenhouse gas emissions, driven largely by economic and population growth, have led to greenhouse gas concentrations that are unprecedented in at least the last 800,000 years. These, together with other anthropogenic drivers, are "extremely likely" (where that means more than 95% probability) to have been the dominant cause of the observed global warming since the mid-20th century.

It said that:

Reporting on the publication of the report, The Guardian said that:

The New York Times reported that:

It went on to say that Ban Ki-moon, the United Nations secretary general, had declared his intention to call a meeting of heads of state in 2014 to develop such a treaty. The last such meeting, in Copenhagen in 2009, the NY Times reported, had ended in disarray.

Intergovernmental Panel on Climate Change (IPCC) 2007 
In February 2007, the IPCC released a summary of the forthcoming Fourth Assessment Report. According to this summary, the Fourth Assessment Report found that human actions are "very likely" the cause of global warming, meaning a 90% or greater probability. Global warming in this case was indicated by an increase of 0.75 degrees in average global temperatures over the last 100 years.

The IPCC Fourth Assessment Report stated that:
 Warming of the climate system is unequivocal, as evidenced by increases in global average air and ocean temperatures, the widespread melting of snow and ice, and rising global average sea level.
 Most of the global warming since the mid-20th century is very likely due to human activities.

 Benefits and costs of climate change for [human] society will vary widely by location and scale. Some of the effects in temperate and polar regions will be positive, and others elsewhere will be negative. Overall, net effects are more likely to be strongly negative with larger or more rapid warming.
 The range of published evidence indicates that the net damage costs of climate change are likely to be significant and to increase over time.
 The resilience of many ecosystems is likely to be exceeded this century by an unprecedented combination of climate change, associated disturbances (e.g. flooding, drought, wildfire, insects, ocean acidification), and other global change drivers (e.g. land-use change, pollution, fragmentation of natural systems, over-exploitation of resources).

The New York Times reported that "the leading international network of climate scientists has concluded for the first time that global warming is 'unequivocal' and that human activity is the main driver, 'very likely' causing most of the rise in temperatures since 1950".

A retired journalist for The New York Times, William K. Stevens wrote: "The Intergovernmental Panel on Climate Change said the likelihood was 90 percent to 99 percent that emissions of heat-trapping greenhouse gases like carbon dioxide, spewed from tailpipes and smokestacks, were the dominant cause of the observed warming of the last 50 years. In the panel's parlance, this level of certainty is labeled 'very likely'. Only rarely does scientific odds-making provide a more definite answer than that, at least in this branch of science, and it describes the endpoint, so far, of a progression."

The Associated Press summarized the position on sea level rise:

U.S. Global Change Research Program 

Thirteen federal agencies, led by the National Oceanic and Atmospheric Administration (NOAA), worked together under the auspices of the United States Global Change Research Program (USGCRP) to prepare the country's Fourth National Climate Assessment, published in two volumes as described below.

The Climate Science Special Report: Fourth National Climate Assessment, Volume I (October 2017) provided the following summary: 
This assessment concludes, based on extensive evidence, that it is extremely likely that human activities, especially emissions of greenhouse gases, are the dominant cause of the observed warming since the mid-20th century. For the warming over the last century, there is no convincing alternative explanation supported by the extent of the observational evidence.

Background
Formerly: Climate Change Science Program

The U.S. Global Change Research Program reported in June 2009 that:

The 2009 report, which is about the effects that climate change is having in the United States, also said:

Arctic Climate Impact Assessment 
In 2004, the intergovernmental Arctic Council and the non-governmental International Arctic Science Committee released the synthesis report of the Arctic Climate Impact Assessment:

Policy 

There is an extensive discussion in the scientific literature on what policies might be effective in responding to climate change. Some scientific bodies have recommended specific policies to governments (refer to the later sections of the article). The natural and social sciences can play a role in informing an effective response to climate change. However, policy decisions may require value judgements. For example, the US National Research Council has commented:The question of whether there exists a "safe" level of concentration of greenhouse gases cannot be answered directly because it would require a value judgment of what constitutes an acceptable risk to human welfare and ecosystems in various parts of the world, as well as a more quantitative assessment of the risks and costs associated with the various impacts of global warming. In general, however, risk increases with increases in both the rate and the magnitude of climate change.

This article mostly focuses on the views of natural scientists. However, social scientists, medical experts, engineers and philosophers have also commented on climate change science and policies. Climate change policy is discussed in several articles: climate change mitigation, climate change adaptation, climate engineering, politics of global warming, climate ethics, and economics of global warming.

Statements by scientific organizations of national or international standing 

This is a list of scientific bodies of national or international standing, that have issued formal statements of opinion, classifies those organizations according to whether they concur with the IPCC view, are non-committal, or dissent from it. The California Governor's Office website lists nearly 200 worldwide scientific organizations hold the position that climate change has been caused by human action.

Concurring

Academies of science (general science) 
Since 2001, 34 national science academies, three regional academies, and both the international InterAcademy Council and International Council of Academies of Engineering and Technological Sciences have made formal declarations confirming human induced global warming and urging nations to reduce emissions of greenhouse gases. The 34 national science academy statements include 33 who have signed joint science academy statements and one individual declaration by the Polish Academy of Sciences in 2007.

Joint national science academy statements 
 2001 Following the publication of the IPCC Third Assessment Report, seventeen national science academies issued a joint statement, entitled "The Science of Climate Change", explicitly acknowledging the IPCC position as representing the scientific consensus on climate change science. The statement, printed in an editorial in the journal Science on 18 May 2001, was signed by the science academies of Australia, Belgium, Brazil, Canada, the Caribbean, China, France, Germany, India, Indonesia, Ireland, Italy, Malaysia, New Zealand, Sweden, Turkey, and the United Kingdom.
 2005 The national science academies of the G8 nations, plus Brazil, China and India, three of the largest emitters of greenhouse gases in the developing world, signed a statement on the global response to climate change. The statement stresses that the scientific understanding of climate change is now sufficiently clear to justify nations taking prompt action, and explicitly endorsed the IPCC consensus. The eleven signatories were the science academies of Brazil, Canada, China, France, Germany, India, Italy, Japan, Russia, the United Kingdom, and the United States.
 2007 In preparation for the 33rd G8 summit, the national science academies of the G8+5 nations issued a declaration referencing the position of the 2005 joint science academies' statement, and acknowledging the confirmation of their previous conclusion by recent research. Following the IPCC Fourth Assessment Report, the declaration states, "It is unequivocal that the climate is changing, and it is very likely that this is predominantly caused by the increasing human interference with the atmosphere. These changes will transform the environmental conditions on Earth unless counter-measures are taken." The thirteen signatories were the national science academies of Brazil, Canada, China, France, Germany, Italy, India, Japan, Mexico, Russia, South Africa, the United Kingdom, and the United States.
 2007 In preparation for the 33rd G8 summit, the Network of African Science Academies submitted a joint "statement on sustainability, energy efficiency, and climate change": 
 2008 In preparation for the 34th G8 summit, the national science academies of the G8+5 nations issued a declaration reiterating the position of the 2005 joint science academies' statement, and reaffirming "that climate change is happening and that anthropogenic warming is influencing many physical and biological systems". Among other actions, the declaration urges all nations to "[t]ake appropriate economic and policy measures to accelerate transition to a low carbon society and to encourage and effect changes in individual and national behaviour". The thirteen signatories were the same national science academies that issued the 2007 joint statement.
 2009 In advance of the UNFCCC negotiations to be held in Copenhagen in December 2009, the national science academies of the G8+5 nations issued a joint statement declaring, "Climate change and sustainable energy supply are crucial challenges for the future of humanity. It is essential that world leaders agree on the emission reductions needed to combat negative consequences of anthropogenic climate change". The statement references the IPCC's Fourth Assessment of 2007, and asserts that "climate change is happening even faster than previously estimated; global  emissions since 2000 have been higher than even the highest predictions, Arctic sea ice has been melting at rates much faster than predicted, and the rise in the sea level has become more rapid". The thirteen signatories were the same national science academies that issued the 2007 and 2008 joint statements.

Polish Academy of Sciences 
In December 2007, the General Assembly of the Polish Academy of Sciences (Polska Akademia Nauk), which has not been a signatory to joint national science academy statements issued a declaration endorsing the IPCC conclusions, and stating:

Additional national science academy and society statements 
 American Association for the Advancement of Science as the world's largest general scientific society, adopted an official statement on climate change in 2006: 
 Federation of Australian Scientific and Technological Societies in 2008 published FASTS Statement on Climate Change which states: 
 United States National Research Council through its Committee on the Science of Climate Change in 2001, published Climate Change Science: An Analysis of Some Key Questions. This report explicitly endorses the IPCC view of attribution of recent climate change as representing the view of the scientific community: 
 Royal Society of New Zealand having signed onto the first joint science academy statement in 2001, released a separate statement in 2008 in order to clear up "the controversy over climate change and its causes, and possible confusion among the public": 
 The Royal Society of the United Kingdom has not changed its concurring stance reflected in its participation in joint national science academies' statements on anthropogenic global warming. According to the Telegraph, "The most prestigious group of scientists in the country was forced to act after fellows complained that doubts over man made global warming were not being communicated to the public". In May 2010, it announced that it "is presently drafting a new public facing document on climate change, to provide an updated status report on the science in an easily accessible form, also addressing the levels of certainty of key components." The society says that it is three years since the last such document was published and that, after an extensive process of debate and review, the new document was printed in September 2010. It summarises the current scientific evidence and highlights the areas where the science is well established, where there is still some debate, and where substantial uncertainties remain. The society has stated that "this is not the same as saying that the climate science itself is in error – no Fellows have expressed such a view to the RS".  The introduction includes this statement:

International science academies 
 African Academy of Sciences in 2007 was a signatory to the "statement on sustainability, energy efficiency, and climate change". This joint statement of African science academies, was organized through the Network of African Science Academies. Its stated goal was "to convey information and spur action on the occasion of the G8 Summit in Heiligendamm, Germany, in June 2007": 
 European Academy of Sciences and Arts in 2007 issued a formal declaration on climate change titled Let's Be Honest: 
 European Science Foundation in a 2007 position paper states: 
 InterAcademy Council As the representative of the world's scientific and engineering academies, the InterAcademy Council issued a report in 2007 titled Lighting the Way: Toward a Sustainable Energy Future. 
 International Council of Academies of Engineering and Technological Sciences (CAETS) in 2007, issued a Statement on Environment and Sustainable Growth:

Physical and chemical sciences 
 American Chemical Society
 American Institute of Physics
 American Physical Society
 Australian Institute of Physics
 European Physical Society

Earth sciences

American Geophysical Union 
The American Geophysical Union (AGU) adopted a statement on Climate Change and Greenhouse Gases in 1998. A new statement, adopted by the society in 2003, revised in 2007, and revised and expanded in 2013, affirms that rising levels of greenhouse gases have caused and will continue to cause the global surface temperature to be warmer:

American Society of Agronomy, Crop Science Society of America, and Soil Science Society of America 
In May 2011, the American Society of Agronomy (ASA), Crop Science Society of America (CSSA), and Soil Science Society of America (SSSA) issued a joint position statement on climate change as it relates to agriculture:

European Federation of Geologists 
In 2008, the European Federation of Geologists (EFG) issued the position paper Carbon Capture and geological Storage:

European Geosciences Union 
In 2005, the Divisions of Atmospheric and Climate Sciences of the European Geosciences Union (EGU) issued a position statement in support of the Joint national science academy statements on global response to climate change. The statement refers to the Intergovernmental Panel on Climate Change (IPCC), as "the main representative of the global scientific community", and asserts that the IPCC:

Additionally, in 2008, the EGU issued a position statement on ocean acidification which states, "Ocean acidification is already occurring today and will continue to intensify, closely tracking atmospheric  increase. Given the potential threat to marine ecosystems and its ensuing impact on human society and economy, especially as it acts in conjunction with anthropogenic global warming, there is an urgent need for immediate action." And, in 2018 the EGU issued a statement concurring with the findings of the Special Report on Global Warming of 1.5 °C, with Jonathan Bamber, president of the organisation, noting: "EGU concurs with, and supports, the findings of the SR15 that action to curb the most dangerous consequences of human-induced climate change is urgent, of the utmost importance and the window of opportunity extremely limited."

Geological Society of America 
In 2006, the Geological Society of America adopted a position statement on global climate change. It amended this position on 20 April 2010, with more explicit comments on need for  reduction:

Geological Society of London 
In November 2010, the Geological Society of London issued the position statement Climate change: evidence from the geological record:

International Union of Geodesy and Geophysics 
In July 2007, the International Union of Geodesy and Geophysics (IUGG) adopted a resolution titled "The Urgency of Addressing Climate Change". In it, the IUGG concurs with the "comprehensive and widely accepted and endorsed scientific assessments carried out by the Intergovernmental Panel on Climate Change and regional and national bodies, which have firmly established, on the basis of scientific evidence, that human activities are the primary cause of recent climate change". They state further that the "continuing reliance on combustion of fossil fuels as the world's primary source of energy will lead to much higher atmospheric concentrations of greenhouse gases, which will, in turn, cause significant increases in surface temperature, sea level, ocean acidification, and their related consequences to the environment and society".

National Association of Geoscience Teachers 
In July 2009, the National Association of Geoscience Teachers (NAGT) adopted a position statement on climate change in which they assert that "Earth's climate is changing [and] "that present warming trends are largely the result of human activities":

Meteorology and oceanography

American Meteorological Society 
The American Meteorological Society (AMS) statement adopted by their council in 2012 concluded:

A 2016 survey found that two-thirds of AMS members think that all or most of climate change is caused by human activity.

Australian Meteorological and Oceanographic Society 
The Australian Meteorological and Oceanographic Society has issued a Statement on Climate Change, wherein they conclude:

Canadian Foundation for Climate and Atmospheric Sciences 
In November 2005, the Canadian Foundation for Climate and Atmospheric Sciences (CFCAS) issued a letter to the Prime Minister of Canada stating that:

Canadian Meteorological and Oceanographic Society 
In November 2009,  a letter to the Canadian Parliament by The Canadian Meteorological and Oceanographic Society states:

Royal Meteorological Society (UK) 
In February 2007, after the release of the IPCC's Fourth Assessment Report, the Royal Meteorological Society issued an endorsement of the report. In addition to referring to the IPCC as "[the] world's best climate scientists", they stated that climate change is happening as "the result of emissions since industrialization and we have already set in motion the next 50 years of global warming – what we do from now on will determine how worse it will get."

World Meteorological Organization 
In its Statement at the Twelfth Session of the Conference of the Parties to the U.N. Framework Convention on Climate Change presented on 15 November 2006, the World Meteorological Organization (WMO) confirms the need to "prevent dangerous anthropogenic interference with the climate system". The WMO concurs that "scientific assessments have increasingly reaffirmed that human activities are indeed changing the composition of the atmosphere, in particular through the burning of fossil fuels for energy production and transportation".

American Quaternary Association 
The American Quaternary Association (AMQUA) has stated:

International Union for Quaternary Research 
The statement on climate change issued by the International Union for Quaternary Research (INQUA) reiterates the conclusions of the IPCC, and urges all nations to take prompt action in line with the UNFCCC principles:

Biology and life sciences 
Life science organizations have outlined the dangers climate change pose to wildlife.
 American Association of Wildlife Veterinarians
 American Institute of Biological Sciences. In October 2009, the leaders of 18 US scientific societies and organizations sent an open letter to the United States Senate reaffirming the scientific consensus that climate change is occurring and is primarily caused by human activities.  The American Institute of Biological Sciences (AIBS) adopted this letter as their official position statement. The letter goes on to warn of predicted impacts on the United States such as sea level rise and increases in extreme weather events, water scarcity, heat waves, wildfires, and the disturbance of biological systems.  It then advocates for a dramatic reduction in emissions of greenhouse gases.
 American Society for Microbiology
 Australian Coral Reef Society
 Institute of Biology (UK)
 Society of American Foresters issued two position statements pertaining to climate change in which they cite the IPCC and the UNFCCC.
 The Wildlife Society (international)

Human health 
A number of health organizations have warned about the numerous negative health effects of global warming:
 American Academy of Pediatrics
 American College of Preventive Medicine
 American Medical Association
 American Public Health Association
 Australian Medical Association in 2004 and in 2008
 World Federation of Public Health Associations
 World Health Organization

The Bulletin of the Atomic Scientists and "Doomsday clock" 
In 1945, Albert Einstein and other scientists who created atomic weapons used in the atomic bombings of Hiroshima and Nagasaki founded the "Bulletin of the Atomic Scientists" and created the "Doomsday Clock". The goal of the clock is to convey threats to humanity and the planet, and to create public awareness that will lead to solutions. In the beginning, the Doomsday Clock focused on the dangers of nuclear war, but in the 21st century, it has begun to deal with other issues like climate change and disinformation on the internet.

On 23 January 2020 the organization moved the doomsday clock to 100 seconds before midnight, closer than ever. It explained that it did it because of three factors:
 Increasing danger of nuclear war,
 Increasing danger from climate change, and
 Increasing danger from disinformation in the internet regarding the issues in points 1 and 2 and other "disruptive technologies".

The organization praised the climate movement of young people and called to citizens and governments to act to take greater action on climate change.

Miscellaneous 
A number of other national scientific societies have also endorsed the opinion of the IPCC:
 American Astronomical Society
 American Statistical Association
 Canadian Council of Professional Engineers  
 The Institution of Engineers Australia
 International Association for Great Lakes Research
 Institute of Professional Engineers New Zealand
 World Federation of Engineering Organizations (WFEO)

Non-committal

American Association of Petroleum Geologists 
As of June 2007, the American Association of Petroleum Geologists (AAPG) Position Statement on climate change stated:

Prior to the adoption of this statement, the AAPG was the only major scientific organization that rejected the finding of significant human influence on recent climate, according to a statement by the Council of the American Quaternary Association. Explaining the plan for a revision, AAPG president Lee Billingsly wrote in March 2007:

AAPG President John Lorenz announced the "sunsetting" of AAPG's Global Climate Change Committee in January 2010.  The AAPG Executive Committee determined:

American Institute of Professional Geologists (AIPG) 
The official position statement from AIPG on the Environment states that "combustion of fossil fuel include and the generation of GHGs [greenhouse gases] including carbon dioxide (CO2) and methane (CH4).  Emissions of GHGs are perceived by some to be one of the largest, global environmental concerns related to energy production due to potential effects on the global energy system and possibly global climate. Fossil fuel use is the primary source of the increased atmospheric concentration of GHGs since industrialization".

In March 2010, AIPG's Executive Director issued a statement regarding polarization of opinions on climate change within the membership and announced that the AIPG Executive had made a decision to cease publication of articles and opinion pieces concerning climate change in AIPG's news journal, The Professional Geologist.

Opposing 
Since 2007, when the American Association of Petroleum Geologists released a revised statement, no longer does any national or international scientific body reject the findings of human-induced effects on climate change.

Surveys of scientists and scientific literature 

Various surveys have been conducted to evaluate scientific opinion on global warming. They have concluded that almost all climate scientists support the idea of anthropogenic climate change.

In 2004, the geologist and historian of science Naomi Oreskes summarized a study of the scientific literature on climate change. She analyzed 928 abstracts of papers from refereed scientific journals between 1993 and 2003 and concluded that there is a scientific consensus on the reality of anthropogenic climate change.

Oreskes divided the abstracts into six categories: explicit endorsement of the consensus position, evaluation of impacts, mitigation proposals, methods, paleoclimate analysis, and rejection of the consensus position. Seventy-five per cent of the abstracts were placed in the first three categories (either explicitly or implicitly accepting the consensus view); 25% dealt with methods or paleoclimate, thus taking no position on current anthropogenic climate change. None of the abstracts disagreed with the consensus position, which the author found to be "remarkable". According to the report, "authors evaluating impacts, developing methods, or studying paleoclimatic change might believe that current climate change is natural. However, none of these papers argued that point."

In 2007, Harris Interactive surveyed 489 randomly selected members of either the American Meteorological Society or the American Geophysical Union for the Statistical Assessment Service (STATS) at George Mason University. 97% of the scientists surveyed agreed that global temperatures had increased during the past 100 years; 84% said they personally believed human-induced warming was occurring, and 74% agreed that "currently available scientific evidence" substantiated its occurrence. Catastrophic effects in 50–100 years would likely be observed according to 41%, while 44% thought the effects would be moderate and about 13 percent saw relatively little danger. 5% said they thought human activity did not contribute to greenhouse warming.

Dennis Bray and Hans von Storch conducted a survey in August 2008 of 2058 climate scientists from 34 countries. A web link with a unique identifier was given to each respondent to eliminate multiple responses. A total of 373 responses were received giving an overall response rate of 18.2%. No paper on climate change consensus based on this survey has been published yet (February 2010), but one on another subject has been published based on the survey.

The survey was made up of 76 questions split into a number of sections.
There were sections on the demographics of the respondents, their assessment of the state of climate science, how good the science is, climate change impacts, adaptation and mitigation, their opinion of the IPCC, and how well climate science was being communicated to the public.
Most of the answers were on a scale from 1 to 7 from "not at all" to "very much".

To the question "How convinced are you that climate change, whether natural or anthropogenic, is occurring now?", 67.1% said they very much agreed, 26.7% agreed to some large extent, 6.2% said to they agreed to some small extent (2–4), none said they did not agree at all. To the question "How convinced are you that most of recent or near future climate change is, or will
be, a result of anthropogenic causes?" the responses were 34.6% very much agree, 48.9% agreeing to a large extent, 15.1% to a small extent, and 1.35% not agreeing at all.

A poll performed by Peter Doran and Maggie Kendall Zimmerman at University of Illinois at Chicago received replies from 3,146 of the 10,257 polled Earth scientists. Results were analyzed globally and by specialization. 76 out of 79 climatologists who "listed climate science as their area of expertise and who also have published more than 50% of their recent peer-reviewed papers on the subject of climate change" believed that mean global temperatures had risen compared to pre-1800s levels. Seventy-five of 77 believed that human activity is a significant factor in changing mean global temperatures. Among all respondents, 90% agreed that temperatures have risen compared to pre-1800 levels, and 82% agreed that humans significantly influence the global temperature. Economic geologists and meteorologists were among the biggest doubters, with only 47 percent and 64 percent, respectively, believing in significant human involvement. The authors summarised the findings:

A 2010 paper in the Proceedings of the National Academy of Sciences of the United States (PNAS) reviewed publication and citation data for 1,372 climate researchers and drew the following two conclusions:

(i) 97–98% of the climate researchers most actively publishing in the field support the tenets of ACC (Anthropogenic Climate Change) outlined by the Intergovernmental Panel on Climate Change, and (ii) the relative climate expertise and scientific prominence of the researchers unconvinced of ACC are substantially below that of the convinced researchers.

A 2013 paper in Environmental Research Letters reviewed 11,944 abstracts of scientific papers matching "global warming" or "global climate change". They found 4,014 which discussed the cause of recent global warming, and of these "97.1% endorsed the consensus position that humans are causing global warming". This study was criticised in 2016 by Richard Tol, but strongly defended by a companion paper in the same volume.

A 2012 analysis of published research on global warming and climate change between 1991 and 2012 found that of the 13,950 articles in peer-reviewed journals, only 24 rejected anthropogenic global warming. A follow-up analysis looking at 2,258 peer-reviewed climate articles with 9,136 authors published between November 2012 and December 2013 revealed that only one of the 9,136 authors rejected anthropogenic global warming. His 2015 paper on the topic, covering 24,210 articles published by 69,406 authors during 2013 and 2014 found only five articles by four authors rejecting anthropogenic global warming. Over 99.99% of climate scientists did not reject AGW in their peer-reviewed research.

James Lawrence Powell reported in 2017 that using rejection as the criterion of consensus, five surveys of the peer-reviewed literature from 1991 to 2015, including several of those above, combine to 54,195 articles with an average consensus of 99.94%.
In November 2019, his survey of over 11,600 peer-reviewed articles published in the first seven months of 2019 showed that the consensus had reached 100%.

A survey conducted in 2021 found that of a random selection of 3,000 papers examined from 88,125 peer-reviewed studies related to climate that were published since 2012, only 4 were sceptical about man-made climate change.

Depending on expertise, a 2021 survey of 2780 Earth scientist showed that between 91% to 100% agreed human activity is causing climate change. Among climate scientists, 98.7% agreed, a number that grows to 100% when only the climate scientists with high level of expertise are counted (20+ papers published).

Existence of a scientific consensus 

A question that frequently arose in popular discussion was whether there is a scientific consensus on climate change.  Several scientific organizations have explicitly used the term "consensus" in their statements:
 American Association for the Advancement of Science, 2006: "The conclusions in this statement reflect the scientific consensus represented by, for example, the Intergovernmental Panel on Climate Change, and the Joint National Academies' statement."
 US National Academy of Sciences: "In the judgment of most climate scientists, Earth's warming in recent decades has been caused primarily by human activities that have increased the amount of greenhouse gases in the atmosphere. ... On climate change, [the National Academies' reports] have assessed consensus findings on the science ..."
 Joint Science Academies' statement, 2005: "We recognise the international scientific consensus of the Intergovernmental Panel on Climate Change (IPCC)."
 Joint Science Academies' statement, 2001: "The work of the Intergovernmental Panel on Climate Change (IPCC) represents the consensus of the international scientific community on climate change science. We recognise IPCC as the world's most reliable source of information on climate change and its causes, and we endorse its method of achieving this consensus."
 American Meteorological Society, 2003: "The nature of science is such that there is rarely total agreement among scientists. Individual scientific statements and papers—the validity of some of which has yet to be assessed adequately—can be exploited in the policy debate and can leave the impression that the scientific community is sharply divided on issues where there is, in reality, a strong scientific consensus ... IPCC assessment reports are prepared at approximately five-year intervals by a large international group of experts who represent the broad range of expertise and perspectives relevant to the issues. The reports strive to reflect a consensus evaluation of the results of the full body of peer-reviewed research ... They provide an analysis of what is known and not known, the degree of consensus, and some indication of the degree of confidence that can be placed on the various statements and conclusions."
 Network of African Science Academies: "A consensus, based on current evidence, now exists within the global scientific community that human activities are the main source of climate change and that the burning of fossil fuels is largely responsible for driving this change."
 International Union for Quaternary Research, 2008: "INQUA recognizes the international scientific consensus of the Intergovernmental Panel on Climate Change (IPCC)."
 Australian Coral Reef Society, 2006: "There is almost total consensus among experts that the earth's climate is changing as a result of the build-up of greenhouse gases ... There is broad scientific consensus that coral reefs are heavily affected by the activities of man and there are significant global influences that can make reefs more vulnerable such as global warming ..."

See also 

 4 Degrees and Beyond International Climate Conference
 Climate change
 Climate change denial
 Economics of climate change
 Effects of climate change
 Global warming controversy
 History of climate change science
 Public opinion on climate change
 List of climate scientists
 World Scientists' Warning to Humanity

Notes

References 

 .
 .
 .
 .
 . Climate Change 2013 Working Group 1 website.
 . Archived
 . Archived

External links 
 

Articles containing video clips
.
Climate change assessment and attribution
Climatology
Consensus